Nicholas Matveev (born August 7, 1997) is a Canadian sprint kayaker.

Career
At the World Championships, as part of the K4 boat, Matveev finished in ninth in the second semifinal, failing to qualify for the finals. A year later, the boat finished in fifth in the B final (14th overall).

In May 2021, Matveev was named to Canada's 2020 Olympic team.

References

1997 births
Canadian male canoeists
Living people
Sportspeople from Toronto
Canoeists at the 2020 Summer Olympics
Olympic canoeists of Canada